Dramatic conventions are the specific actions and  techniques the actor, writer or director has employed to create a desired dramatic effect/style.

A dramatic convention is a set of rules which both the audience and actors are familiar with and which act as a useful way of quickly signifying the nature of the action or of a character.

All forms of theatre have dramatic conventions, some of which may be unique to that particular form, such as the poses used by actors in Japanese kabuki theatre to establish a character, or the stock character of the black-cloaked, moustache twirling villain in early cinema melodrama serials.

It can also include an implausible facet of a performance required by the technical limitations or artistic nature of a production and which is accepted by the audience as part of suspension of disbelief. For example, a dramatic convention in Shakespeare is that a character can move downstage to deliver a soliloquy which cannot be heard by the other characters on stage nor are characters in a musical surprised by another character bursting into song. One more example would be how the audience accepts the passage of time during a play or how music will play during a romantic scene.

Dramatic conventions may be categorized into groups, such as rehearsal, technical or theatrical.
Rehearsal conventions can include hot seating, role on the wall and still images. Technical conventions can include lighting, dialogue, monologue, set, costuming and entrances/exits. Theatrical conventions may include split focus, flashback/flashforward, narration, soliloquy and spoken thought.

See also
 Fourth wall
 Suspension of disbelief

Acting